Child Labour Unit is a Bangladesh government specialized unit under the Ministry of Labour and Employment responsible for eliminating child labor in Bangladesh.

History
Child Labour Unit was established in 2009 under the Ministry of Labour and Employment to eliminate child labor in Bangladesh. This was inline with Convention on the Rights of the Child signed in 1990 and the National Child Policy 2011 policy of the government of Bangladesh. While this was mean't to be a temporary unit, the government of Bangladesh moved to make it a permanent unit under the Ministry of Labour and Employment.

References

2009 establishments in Bangladesh
Organisations based in Dhaka
Government agencies of Bangladesh
Government departments of Bangladesh
Child labour-related organizations
Ministry of Labour and Employment (Bangladesh)